The 2020 Louisiana Tech Bulldogs football team represented Louisiana Tech University in the 2020 NCAA Division I FBS football season. The Bulldogs played their home games at Joe Aillet Stadium in Ruston, Louisiana, and competed in the West Division of Conference USA (C-USA). They were led by eighth-year head coach Skip Holtz.

Previous season
The Bulldogs finished the 2019 campaign 10–3, 6–2 in C-USA play to finish in tied for first place in the West Division, but falling short of the conference championship invitation after losing to eventual division co-champion UAB earlier in the season. The Bulldogs were invited to play in the nearby Independence Bowl, their first time taking part in the annual Shreveport, Louisiana bowl game since their 2008 victory against NIU. They played Miami (FL) and won their eighth overall bowl game by the score of 14–0.

Preseason

Recruiting class
Reference:

|}

Award watch lists
Listed in the order that they were released

C-USA coaches poll
The C-USA coaches poll will be released in July 2020

Offense

1st team

2nd team

Defense

1st team

2nd team

C-USA Preseason All-Conference teams

Offense

1st team

2nd team

Defense

1st team

2nd team

Roster

Schedule
Louisiana Tech announced its 2020 football schedule on January 8, 2020. The 2020 schedule consists of 5 home and 7 away games in the regular season.

The Bulldogs had games scheduled against Prairie View A&M, UNLV, and Vanderbilt, which were canceled due to the COVID-19 pandemic. On July 22, Louisiana Tech announced it had added a game against Houston Baptist as a replacement for Prairie View A&M.

Source:

Game summaries

at Southern Miss

Houston Baptist

at BYU

UTEP

Marshall

at UTSA

UAB

at North Texas

at TCU

vs. Georgia Southern (New Orleans Bowl)

Players drafted into the NFL

References

Louisiana Tech
Louisiana Tech Bulldogs football seasons
Louisiana Tech Bulldogs football